Schismorhynchus labialis, the grooved-jaw worm-eel, is a species of eel in the family Ophichthidae. It is the only member of its genus. It is known from the Indian and Pacific Oceans.

References

Ophichthidae
Fish described in 1917